The 2016–17 Liga Leumit is the 18th season as second tier since its re-alignment in 1999 and the 75rd season of second-tier football in Israel.

A total of sixteen teams are contesting in the league, including twelve sides from the 2015–16 season, the two promoted teams from 2015–16 Liga Alef and the two relegated teams from 2015–16 Israeli Premier League.

Changes from 2015–16 season

Team changes
F.C. Ashdod and Hapoel Ashkelon, were promoted to the 2016–17 Israeli Premier League.

Maccabi Netanya and Hapoel Akko were relegated after finishing as the two bottom-placed clubs in the 2015–16 Israeli Premier League.

Maccabi Kiryat Gat, and Maccabi Yavne were directly relegated to Liga Alef after finishing in the previous season in last two league places. They were replaced the top placed teams from each division of 2015–16 Liga Alef, Maccabi Sha'arayim (from South Division) and Ironi Nesher (from North Division).

Overview

Stadia and locations

The club is playing their home games at a neutral venue because their own ground does not meet Premier League requirements.

Regular season

Regular season table

Playoffs

Top Playoff

Top Playoff table

Bottom Playoff

Bottom Playoff table

Positions by round
The table lists the positions of teams after each week of matches.

Promotion/relegation playoff
The 14th-placed team will face 2016–17 Liga Alef promotion play-offs winner in a two-legged tie. The matches took place on 27 and 30 May 2017.

Hapoel Nazareth Illit won 3–2 on aggregate and remained in Liga Leumit. F.C. Kafr Qasim remained in Liga Alef.

See also
 2016–17 Toto Cup Leumit

References

2016–17 in Israeli football leagues
Liga Leumit seasons
Isr